Callington was a rotten borough in Cornwall which returned two Members of Parliament to the House of Commons in the English and later British Parliament from 1585 to 1832, when it was abolished by the Reform Act 1832.

History
The borough consisted of most of the town of Callington in the East of Cornwall. Callington was the last of the Cornish rotten boroughs to be enfranchised, returning its first members in 1585; like most of the Cornish boroughs enfranchised or re-enfranchised during the Tudor period, it was a rotten borough from the start, and was never substantial enough to have a mayor and corporation.

The right to vote in Callington was disputed until a decision of the House of Commons in 1821 settled it as resting with "freeholders of the borough and ... life-tenants of freeholders, resident for 40 days before the election and rated to the poor at 40 shillings or more". This considerably enlarged the electorate, for there had been only 42 voters in the borough in 1816, but the Parliamentary return of 1831 reported that 225 were qualified. In the 18th century the power of the "patron" to influence the voters in Callington was considered absolute. In 1831 the borough had a population of 1,082, and 225 houses; the part of the town outside the borough boundaries contained only a further eight houses, leaving no scope to enlarge it. It was disfranchised by the Great Reform Act in 1832.

Patrons of pocket borough
The two patrons of the pocket borough of Callington were the Rolle family of Heanton Satchville, Petrockstowe, Devon (a junior branch of the Rolle family of Stevenstone and Bicton in Devon) and the Coryton family of the adjacent manor of  St. Mellion, Cornwall.

Rolle patronage
In 1601 Robert Rolle (died 1633) of Heanton Satchville, Petrockstowe, Devon (a grandson of George Rolle (d.1552) of Stevenstone, founder of the Rolle family in Devon), purchased the manor of Callington in Cornwall, thereby gaining the pocket borough seat of Callington in Parliament, which in future served to promote the careers of many Rolles and descendants of that family. He nominated to this seat his first cousin once-removed John Rolle (born 1563) in 1601, his
brother William Rolle (died 1652) in 1604 and 1614, his son Sir Henry Rolle (1589–1656), of Shapwick, in 1620 and 1624, his son Samuel's father-in-law Thomas Wise (died March 1641) of Sydenham in Devon, in 1625, and another son John Rolle (1598–1648), in 1626 and 1628. The manor and borough were later inherited by the Rolle heiress Margaret Rolle (1709-1765), suo jure 15th Baroness Clinton, wife of Robert Walpole, 2nd Earl of Orford whose son and heir George Walpole, 3rd Earl of Orford (d.1791) died without progeny. It then passed by inheritance to her cousin George William Trefusis, of Trefusis in Cornwall. Robert George William Trefusis (1764–1797) successfully claimed the title (17th) Baron Clinton in 1794. By 1816 it had passed to Robert Cotton St John Trefusis, 18th Baron Clinton but was no longer as secure as it had been, so that the Coryton family was sufficiently influential to challenge his power on occasion.

Members of Parliament

1585-1640

1640-1832

Notes

References

D Brunton & D H Pennington, “Members of the Long Parliament” (London: George Allen & Unwin, 1954)
"Cobbett's Parliamentary history of England, from the Norman Conquest in 1066 to the year 1803" (London: Thomas Hansard, 1808) 
Maija Jansson (ed.), Proceedings in Parliament, 1614 (House of Commons) (Philadelphia: American Philosophical Society, 1988)
J Holladay Philbin, "Parliamentary Representation 1832 - England and Wales" (New Haven: Yale University Press, 1965)
 
 

Constituencies of the Parliament of the United Kingdom established in 1585
Constituencies of the Parliament of the United Kingdom disestablished in 1832
Parliamentary constituencies in Cornwall (historic)
Rotten boroughs
Callington